opened in 1993 in Karatsu, Saga Prefecture, Japan, on the site of Nagoya Castle, built in 1591 as the base for Hideyoshi's invasions of Korea. It displays artefacts excavated from the castle site and other materials relating to three main themes: (1) the history of exchange between the Japanese archipelago and Korean peninsula; (2) the preservation of the Special Historic Site of Nagoya Castle; (3) cultural and academic exchange between Japan and Korea. The 2,000,000th visit was in August 2010. 

In April 2022 a replica of the Golden Tea Room was installed.

See also
 Saga Prefectural Museum
 List of Historic Sites of Japan (Saga)
 Japan-Korea relations

References

External links
  Saga Prefectural Nagoya Castle Museum

History museums in Japan
Museums in Saga Prefecture
Karatsu, Saga
Prefectural museums
Museums established in 1993
1993 establishments in Japan